The Quebec Rugby Football Union (QRFU) was a football league consisting of teams from Quebec and formed in 1883. Eastern Ontario teams like Ottawa City and Ottawa College joined in 1894.

League formation and play 

The QRFU was formed officially on January 16, 1883, 10 days after the Ontario Rugby Football Union. Teams from the QRFU would compete against member clubs of the ORFU for the Dominion Championship of the CRFU beginning the following season. The QRFU adopted the ORFU point-scoring system in 1884 with the formation of the Canadian Rugby Football Union. The Montreal Foot Ball Club claimed the first ever CRFU Championship 30–0 over the Toronto Football Club.

Teams of the QRFU played 15 men to a side, and did not adopt a down system until 1904, when it agreed that a team must make five yards on its third scrimmage to keep possession of the ball.

Scoring

The QRFU valued a goal from the field (field goal) as six points, a try (touchdown), goals from a try, penalties and free kicks as four points; two points for safety touches; and one point for kicks to the deadline, rouges and touch in goals.

Teams

McGill University (1883–1897)
Montreal Football Club (1883–1906)
Britania Football Club (1882–1896, 1899–1903)
Quebec City (1883, 1893)
Bishop's College (1884–1885, 1889, 1891)
St. George's College (1887)
Victoria Football Club (1890)
Ottawa City Football Club (1894–1897, 1903–1906) (suspended during 1897 season for excessive rough play)
Ottawa College (1894–1904)
Kingston Granites (1898)
Brockville Football Club (1899–1902)
Westmount Football Club (1904–1906)
St. Patrick Saints (1905–1906)

QRFU Champions

Most QRFU Championships
11- Montreal Football Club (1883–89, 1891–93, 1895, 1906)
8- Ottawa College (1894, 1896–99, 1901–04)
1- McGill University (1890)
1- Ottawa Rough Riders 1905
1- Brockville Football Club 1900

Incarnations of QRFU
The QRFU ceased operations in the 1907 after losing their best teams to the IRFU.  The league returned in 1937 for a single season and made another return during World War II.

The league is not related to, nor shares any history, with the Quebec Rugby Federation, which administers rugby football in Quebec.

See also
Interprovincial Rugby Football Union (1907–1959)
Ontario Rugby Football Union

References 
https://web.archive.org/web/20141213001357/http://www.cfl.ca/page/his_timeline_1890
https://web.archive.org/web/20121022100332/http://www.profootballresearchers.org/Coffin_Corner/23-01-876.pdf
https://web.archive.org/web/20121022100101/http://www.profootballresearchers.org/Coffin_Corner/23-02-885.pdf
https://web.archive.org/web/20121022100345/http://www.profootballresearchers.org/Coffin_Corner/23-04-900.pdf
https://web.archive.org/web/20121022100349/http://www.profootballresearchers.org/Coffin_Corner/23-05-908.pdf
https://web.archive.org/web/20101218180627/http://profootballresearchers.org/Coffin_Corner/23-06-916.pdf
https://web.archive.org/web/20101218193052/http://profootballresearchers.org/Coffin_Corner/24-01-919.pdf

Defunct Canadian football leagues
Canadian football leagues in Quebec